The 1898 Pittsburgh College football team was an American football team that represented Pittsburgh Catholic College of the Holy Ghost—now known as Duquesne University—during the 1898 college football season. James Van Cleve served in his first and only season as the team's head coach.

Schedule

References

Pittsburgh College
Duquesne Dukes football seasons
Pittsburgh College football